Social studies is the integrated study of the social sciences and humanities to promote civic competence.

Social studies may also refer to:

Social Studies (band), an American rock band
Social Studies (Carla Bley album), 1981
Social Studies (Loudon Wainwright III album), 1999
Social Studies (book), a 1981 collection of humorous essays by Fran Lebowitz
Social Studies (TV series), a 1997 American sitcom

See also
Social sciences